Marlee Francois (born 29 December 2002) is an Australian professional footballer who plays for Bristol City as a midfielder.

Early life
Born and raised in Sydney suburb Campbelltown, Francois moved to England in 2013 with his family, after which he and his brother Tyrese Francois joined Fulham's academy setup. He is of Mauritian descent through his father, and English descent through his mother. Marlee left Fulham in February 2019 to join Bristol City.

Career
Francois signed a professional contract with Bristol City in March 2021. In July 2021 Francois scored against Bristol City for Portsmouth during a pre-season friendly and Portsmouth found themselves short of fit players. It was dubbed “the shortest loan in history”. The next month Francois joined Bath City F.C. on a short-term loan. Francois signed a two-year contract extension with the option of a further year with Bristol City in August 2022. Francois made his senior Bristol City first team debut appearing as a substitute in the FA Cup against West Brom on 28 January, 2023.

International career
Francois could represent England, Australia or Mauritius internationally. He made his debut for the Australian under-23 team as a substitute on 2 June 2021 against Ireland under-21s.

Career statistics

References

2002 births
Living people
Soccer players from Sydney
Australian soccer players
Australian expatriate sportspeople in England
Association football midfielders
Australian people of Mauritian descent
Australian people of English descent
Fulham F.C. players
Bristol City F.C. players
Bath City F.C. players
National League (English football) players